The Ivy Creek Greenway is a  multi-use trail under construction in the cities of Buford, Georgia and Suwanee, Georgia, in the United States.

In 2014, a 1.5-mile section of the trail was added and includes two boardwalks, an overlook and a 270-foot cable bridge spanning Ivy Creek.

On February 27, 2018, the greenway was designated as one of the signature trails of Gwinnett County.

See also
Cycling infrastructure
10-Minute Walk
Smart growth
Walkability

References

External links
Ivy Creek Greenway

Bike paths in Georgia (U.S. state)
Buford, Georgia
Suwanee, Georgia
Transportation in Gwinnett County, Georgia
Tourist attractions in Gwinnett County, Georgia